The 1949 World Table Tennis Championships women's doubles was the 15th edition of the women's doubles championship.
Gizi Farkas and Helen Elliot defeated Pinkie Barnes and Joan Crosby in the final by three sets to nil.

Results

See also
List of World Table Tennis Championships medalists

References

-
1949 in women's table tennis